Edina Tóth is a Hungarian politician currently serving as a Member of the European Parliament for the Fidesz.

References

Living people
MEPs for Hungary 2019–2024
Fidesz MEPs
Fidesz politicians
Women MEPs for Hungary
21st-century Hungarian politicians
Year of birth missing (living people)